Édouard Benjamin (born 1941) is a diplomat from Guinea. He was Minister of Economy and Finance from 1989 to 1992. He served as Executive Secretary of the Economic Community of West African States (ECOWAS) from 1993 to 1997.

References

1941 births
Living people
Finance ministers of Guinea
Guinean politicians
Executive Secretaries of the Economic Community of West African States
Guinean diplomats